Musse is a surname and given name. Musse (also spelled as musa) (مُوسَىٰ‎, Mūsā) is a male given name in the Arabic language. It is derived from a Hebrew-language phrase meaning "drawn out of the water" and corresponds to Moses (see Moses in Islam). Musa may also be transliterated as Mosa, Moosa, Mousa, Musse or Moussa. Notable people with the name include:

 Ali Musse (born 1996), Somali professional footballer
 Paulo Musse (born 1978), Brazilian footballer
 Musse Olol, Somali-American engineer and social activist
 Musse Yohannes (born 1958), Ethiopian cyclist

See also
 Mousse
 Musser (disambiguation)